Druim Fada (711 m) is a mountain in the Northwest Highlands of Scotland. Located on the northern shore of Loch Hourn in Ross and Cromarty.

A long, craggy ridge, it runs for several kilometres on the northern side of the loch. The nearest village is Arnisdale to the west.

References

Mountains and hills of the Northwest Highlands
Marilyns of Scotland
Grahams